Ketapang Regency is a regency in the south of the province of West Kalimantan, on the island of Borneo in Indonesia. Ketapang Regency occupies an area of 31,588 km2, and at the census in 2010 it had 427,460 inhabitants following the splitting off of five districts in the north-west of the regency in 2007 to form the new North Kayong Regency; the 2020 census revealed a growth in population to 570,657 over the intervening decade; the official estimate as at mid 2021 was 579,927. The principal town lies at Ketapang.

Administrative Districts 
Following the splitting off of the five districts to form the North Kayong Regency in 2007, the Ketapang Regency now consists of twenty districts (kecamatan), tabulated below with their areas and their populations at the 2010 census and the 2020 census; together with the official estimates as at mid 2021. The table includes the locations of the district administrative centres, the number of administrative villages (rural desa and urban kelurahan) in each district, and its post code.

References

Regencies of West Kalimantan